François Claessens (2 October 1897, Berchem - 29 September 1971, Antwerp)  was a Belgian gymnast who competed in the 1920 Summer Olympics. In 1920 he was a member of the Belgian gymnastic team which won the silver medal in the team, European system event.

References

External links
 

1897 births
Belgian male artistic gymnasts
Olympic gymnasts of Belgium
Gymnasts at the 1920 Summer Olympics
Olympic silver medalists for Belgium
1971 deaths
People from Berchem
Olympic medalists in gymnastics
Medalists at the 1920 Summer Olympics
Sportspeople from Antwerp